Gone Shopping is a 2007 Singaporean comedy-drama film directed by Wee Li Lin, starring Kym Ng, Adrian Pang, Aaron Kao, Magdalene Tan and Sonya Nair.

Cast
 Kym Ng as Clara Wong
 Adrian Pang as Valentine Tan
 Aaron Kao as Aaron Ho
 Magdalene Tan as Hui Hui
 Sonya Nair as Renu Balakrishnan
 Selena Tan as Pat Huang

Release
The film was released on 26 July 2007. The film's director's cut premiered at the Far East Film Festival in April 2008.

Reception
Derek Elley of Variety wrote, "Elegantly shot on HD, and with a semi-fairy-tale atmosphere, this is something small but fresh from Singapore’s tiny industry." Ong Sor Fern of The Straits Times rated the film 3.5 stars out of 5 and wrote, "Retail therapy has never been quite this entertainingly thoughtful." Geoffrey Eu of The Business Times gave the film a rating of "B-" and wrote that Wee "gives a refreshingly original spin to a familiar Singaporean pastime – and viewers who take a chance on it will come away impressed by a keenly observed cinematic bargain." Stefan of Twitch Film wrote that the film is "well worth the admission ticket, being able to straddle the arty film realm that most local movies seem to fall under, and having the commercial legs as well."

References

External links
 
 

Singaporean comedy-drama films
2007 comedy-drama films